All or Nothing: Brazil National Team is an Amazon Original docuseries as part of the All or Nothing brand. In the series, Brazil national football team's progress was charted through their winning campaign at the 2019 Copa América.

The show premiered on 31 January 2020.

Episodes

References

External links 
 

Brazil National Team
Brazil national football team
Association football documentary television series
2018 Brazilian television series debuts
2018 Brazilian television series endings
Amazon Prime Video original programming
Television series by Amazon Studios